The Société Anonyme des Anciens Établissements Cail was created in 1883 with a capital of 20,000 francs. It succeeds the Société J. F. Cail & Cie then in liquidation which manufactured locomotives (2,360 between 1845 and 1889 including the famous Crampton) and also bridges such as the Pont d'Arcole, but also the elevator on the third floor of the Eiffel Tower.The Bouffes-du-Nord Theater, the metal frame of the Gare du Musée d'Orsay. It was replaced by the Société française de constructions mécaniques in 1898.

Several banks then took part in its creation:
The Crédit lyonnais 
the Banque de Paris et des Pays-Bas
the Comptoir national d'Escompte de Paris

On January 9, 1890, a new company was formed. Anonymous from Anciens Établissements Cail, with a capital reduced to 10 million francs divided into 20,000 shares of 500 francs. Its head office is located in Paris, 16 rue de Grenelle. The staff is 600 workers.

Production
Production takes place in Paris at Grenelle on the banks of the Seine and at Denain in the North.

Material produced
Artillery material, cables, torpedo boats, railway material, sugar factory..

References

Links
List of Chemins de Fer de l'État locomotives
List of Chemins de Fer du Nord locomotives
List of Chemins de fer de l'Est locomotives

Defunct locomotive manufacturers of France